Vance Desmond Joseph (born September 20, 1972) is an American football coach and former player who is the defensive coordinator of the Denver Broncos of the National Football League (NFL). As a player, Joseph attended the University of Colorado as a quarterback and running back in the 1990s, and was signed by the New York Jets as an undrafted free agent in 1995, playing cornerback for them and then the Indianapolis Colts in 1996. After spending 12 years as a defensive coach in the NFL with San Francisco (2005–10), Houston (2011–13), Cincinnati (2014–15) and Miami (2016), Joseph was hired as head coach by the Denver Broncos in 2017, serving until he was fired after the 2018 season; Joseph was the second African American head coach in Broncos history, after Eric Studesville was interim head coach for 4 games in 2010, and their first African American head coach on a permanent basis. After his first tenure with the Broncos, Joseph served as defensive coordinator for the Arizona Cardinals from 2019 to 2022, before being re-hired by the Broncos as defensive coordinator in 2023.

Playing career

High school career
Joseph was the starting quarterback for three seasons for the Archbishop Shaw High School Eagles. He led his team to a 37–6 record in his three seasons and won Louisiana’s 4A state championship as a sophomore. He garnered USA Today honorable-mention All-America honors as a senior and finished as 4A state runner-up to Ruston High School. Joseph also was a starting guard on Archbishop Shaw's 1988–89 Class 4A state champion basketball team and lettered all four seasons in basketball.

College career
Joseph attended the University of Colorado, and played for the Colorado Buffaloes football team as a quarterback and running back from 1990 to 1994. Joseph played in 30 games for the Buffs as a backup to All-Americans Darian Hagan and Kordell Stewart. He completed 34-of-61 career passes (55.7%) for 454 yards with four touchdowns in addition to rushing 50 times for 237 yards with one touchdown during his college career. Joseph was also a member of the 1990 National Championship team.

Joseph graduated from the Leeds School of Business with a degree in marketing in 1994.

National Football League
Joseph was signed by the New York Jets as an undrafted free agent in 1995 and switched to the defensive back position. He played two seasons in the National Football League for the New York Jets and Indianapolis Colts. During his NFL career, Joseph started six games and recorded two interceptions.

Coaching career

College
Joseph became a graduate assistant for the Colorado Buffaloes in 1999 and was there until 2001. After a brief stint as the secondary coach for Wyoming Cowboys in 2002, Joseph returned to Colorado to become the defensive backs coach in 2002 and 2003. He spent the 2004 season as the defensive backs coach for the Bowling Green Falcons.

San Francisco 49ers
On February 17, 2005, Joseph was hired by the San Francisco 49ers as a secondary assistant. In 2006, he was promoted to secondary coach, a position he shared with Johnnie Lynn until 2010, when Lynn resigned for personal reasons.

Houston Texans
Joseph joined the coaching staff of the Houston Texans in 2011. He served as the defensive backs coach under defensive coordinator Wade Phillips and head coach Gary Kubiak. Joseph helped the Texans to three consecutive top-seven NFL rankings in overall defense. Joseph’s secondary contributed to the team allowing the third-fewest passing yards per game (203.5) during that three-year stretch, helping Houston to its first two division titles in team history and playoff wins from 2011–12.

Cincinnati Bengals
Joseph was hired as the defensive backs coach of the Cincinnati Bengals in January 2014. Joseph helped the Bengals to back-to-back playoff appearances as their defensive backs coach from 2014–15 under head coach Marvin Lewis, guiding a unit that contributed to a league-best 41 interceptions during that span.

Miami Dolphins
Joseph was announced as the defensive coordinator of the Miami Dolphins for the 2016 season under head coach Adam Gase. Joseph oversaw a defense that played a key role in the Dolphins returning to the playoffs for the first time in eight seasons. Despite having to use 13 different starting lineups due to injury, Joseph’s defense ranked fourth in the NFL on third downs (36.2%) while forcing the sixth-most negative plays (107) in the league. The Dolphins won nine of their final 11 regular-season games in 2016 with Joseph’s defense accounting for the fourth-most takeaways (21) in the NFL during that stretch.

Denver Broncos
Joseph was hired as head coach for the Denver Broncos on January 11, 2017, after signing a four-year contract. He is the second African American head coach in Broncos history, after Eric Studesville was interim head coach for 4 games in 2010, and their first African-American head coach on a permanent basis.

On September 11, 2017, on Monday Night Football, Joseph won his head coaching debut in the 24–21 victory over the Los Angeles Chargers.

Joseph finished his first season (2017) as head coach with a 5–11 record and improved to only 6–10 in his second season (2018), resulting in back-to-back losing seasons for the Broncos for the first time since the 1971/1972 seasons. On December 31, 2018, Joseph was fired by the team.

Arizona Cardinals
On January 11, 2019, Joseph was hired by the Arizona Cardinals as their defensive coordinator under head coach Kliff Kingsbury. On October 15, 2021, Kingsbury and several other coaching staff members tested positive for COVID-19. This resulted in Joseph and special teams coordinator Jeff Rodgers taking over as co-interim head coaches for the Cardinals' week 6 game against the Cleveland Browns on October 17, 2021 and they led the Cardinals to a 37–14 win.

Denver Broncos (second stint)
The Broncos re-hired Joseph as their defensive coordinator under head coach Sean Payton on February 25, 2023.

Head coaching record

Personal life
Vance's older brother, Mickey Joseph, is a coach and former Quarterback, who previously served as the interim head coach for the Nebraska Cornhuskers. Vance's younger brother, Sammy Joseph, played defensive back in the NFL and CFL. Vance has two children with his wife, Holly.

Sexual assault allegations 
In 2004, Joseph was accused of sexually assaulting two female trainers while serving as the defensive backs coach at the University of Colorado. The allegations were investigated by a state task force as part of a massive recruiting scandal that involved multiple women claiming they were raped by football players. Joseph was placed on administrative leave, but after one of the two women involved said she did not want to press charges and the other declined to talk to police, the case was closed and Joseph was not charged. Joseph left the University of Colorado and took a job with Bowling Green shortly afterwards. CU’s then-president said at the time that Joseph was also being investigated for sexual harassment in connection with a different incident in which he had sex with a trainer in a campus athletic facility.

The sexual assault allegations resurfaced in 2017 when Joseph was hired as head coach of the Denver Broncos. Before hiring Joseph, Broncos general manager John Elway conducted an investigation into sexual assault and sexual harassment complaints against Joseph and Joseph was asked directly about the accusations during the interview process. Joseph said that the allegations were false but that he was deeply embarrassed by the sexual harassment incident because he was a married father.

References

External links
 Arizona Cardinals bio
 Colorado Buffaloes bio

1972 births
Living people
American football cornerbacks
Archbishop Shaw High School alumni
Arizona Cardinals coaches
Bowling Green Falcons football coaches
Cincinnati Bengals coaches
Colorado Buffaloes football coaches
Colorado Buffaloes football players
Denver Broncos coaches
Denver Broncos head coaches
Houston Texans coaches
Indianapolis Colts players
National Football League defensive coordinators
New York Jets players
San Francisco 49ers coaches
Wyoming Cowboys football coaches
People from Marrero, Louisiana
Players of American football from Louisiana
African-American coaches of American football
African-American players of American football
Coaches of American football from Louisiana
21st-century African-American sportspeople
20th-century African-American sportspeople